Universal Soldier may refer to:

Arts, entertainment, and media

Fictional characters
 Luc Deveraux, the main character from the Universal Soldier film series

Films
 Universal Soldier (film series)
 Universal Soldier (1992)
 Universal Soldier II: Brothers in Arms (1998)
 Universal Soldier III: Unfinished Business (1998)
 Universal Soldier: The Return (1999)
 Universal Soldier: Regeneration (2009)
 Universal Soldier: Day of Reckoning (2012)
 Universal Soldier, a 1971 film directed by Cy Endfield
 Universal Soldiers, a 2007 military science fiction film

Music 
 "Universal Soldier" (song), a 1964 song by Buffy Sainte-Marie
 Universal Soldier (1967 Donovan album)
 Universal Soldier (1995 Donovan album)
 Universal Soldier (Pastor Troy album), 2002

Other 
 Universal Soldier, rebranded version of the Turrican II: The Final Fight video game